Amadou Sanyang (born 1 August 1991) is a Gambian footballer who plays as a defender or midfielder.

Career

Professional
Sanyang began his professional career with Real de Banjul of the Gambian Championnat National D1. Sanyang's time with Real de Banjul was a successful one, and in 2007 he was honoured as the best midfielder in the Gambian League.

His play with the Gambian Under-20 National Team sparked interest among Major League Soccer clubs and in early 2009 he was signed by Toronto FC along with a fellow countrymen Emmanuel Gomez. Due to his age he was initially ineligible to join the senior squad until his 18th birthday, which took place on 1 August 2009; during this time he trained with both the senior team and the TFC Academy. He played with the Toronto FC Academy in the Canadian Soccer League during this time.

Sanyang made his debut for Toronto FC on 1 August 2009 as a sub vs. New England Revolution.

In September 2009, two Ligue 1 clubs sent scouts to Toronto to watch him in action. Dutch club PSV Eindhoven also requested video footage.

Sanyang made 14 appearances in his second year with Toronto and first full season, he was plagued with a concussion that prevented him making any appearances in the second half of the season.

On 30 July 2011, Sanyang signed with Seattle Sounders FC.

After his release by Seattle, Sanyang signed with USL Pro club Charleston Battery on 6 April 2012.

International
Sanyang has represented his nation at various youth levels. He was a member of the Gambian U-17 National Team, and is currently part of the U-20 squad. In 2007, he helped lead the Gambian U-17 squad in conquering the Four Nation Tournament held in Côte d'Ivoire. He was named the second best player in the tournament.

Honours

Toronto FC
Canadian Championship (1): 2010

Career statistics

Last update: 30 June 2012

References

External links
 

1991 births
Living people
Gambian footballers
The Gambia youth international footballers
Gambian expatriate footballers
Real de Banjul FC players
Toronto FC players
Seattle Sounders FC players
Charleston Battery players
Tacoma Defiance players
Expatriate soccer players in Canada
Expatriate soccer players in the United States
Canadian Soccer League (1998–present) players
Major League Soccer players
USL Championship players
Gambian expatriate sportspeople in the United States
Gambian expatriate sportspeople in Canada
People from Bakau
Association football defenders
Association football midfielders